Fred C. Reger (April 14, 1916 – September 12, 1994) was a member of the Wisconsin State Assembly.

Biography
Reger was born in Clare, Michigan. He later moved to Merrill, Wisconsin.

Career
Reger was elected to the Assembly in 1962. From 1946 to 1948, he served as Mayor of Merrill. Additionally, he was a member of the Merrill City Council, eventually serving as its president, and the Lincoln County, Wisconsin Board. He was a Republican.

References

People from Clare, Michigan
People from Merrill, Wisconsin
County supervisors in Wisconsin
Mayors of places in Wisconsin
Wisconsin city council members
1916 births
1994 deaths
20th-century American politicians
Republican Party members of the Wisconsin State Assembly